Hal Clements was an actor and director of silent films in the U.S. He starred in dozens of silent films. He married writer Olga Printzlau.

Clements was part of Kalem's Jacksonville film crew. In 1914, he directed and managed the studio's comedy unit in Santa Monica featuring Ruth Roland and John Brennan (actor). He portrayed General John Pershing in a Thomas Ince film. In 1916 he was managing director of the new Gate City Feature Film Company.

Filmography
 Uncle Tom's Cabin (1913 film)
 The Grim Toll of War (1913)
 O'Brien Finds a Way (1914)
 Armstrong's Wife (1915)
 Out of the Darkness (1915 film)
 The Unknown (1915 drama film)
 The Secret Sin (1915)
 The Immigrant (1915 film)
 The Girl Telegrapher's Nerve (1916)
 Miss Jackie of the Army (1917)
 An American Live Wire (1918)
 Other Men's Wives (1919)
 An Innocent Adventuress (1919)
 The Siege of Petersburg
 The Sacrifice at the Spillway
 The Man Who Could Not Lose, a Biograph film, as Jack Carter
 Seventeen (1940 film)
 Wichita (1955)

References

External links
Hal Clements on IMDb

American male film actors
American male silent film actors
20th-century American male actors
American film directors
Year of birth missing
Year of death missing